Archie William Dees (February 22, 1936 – April 4, 2016) was an American professional basketball player. Dees was the No. 2 overall pick in the 1958 NBA draft from Indiana University;

Basketball career

A 6'8" forward/center born in Ethel, Mississippi, Dees started his basketball career at Mount Carmel High School in Mount Carmel, Illinois,  where he was named an All-American his senior year. 

Afterward, he attended Indiana University, where he received the Big Ten Conference Most Valuable Player award twice, in 1957 and 1958.  

Dees is one of just three people (the others being Jerry Lucas and Scott May) to have received multiple Big Ten MVP honors.

When he graduated in 1958, Dees was drafted by the Cincinnati Royals of the National Basketball Association, He went on to play four seasons in the league with the Royals, Detroit Pistons, Chicago Packers, and St. Louis Hawks.

Honors and personal
Dees was inducted into the Indiana University Hall of Fame in 1983.  

In 2001, he was named to the Indiana University All-Century Team.  

Dees died April 4, 2016 in Bloomington, Indiana.

References

External links

1936 births
2016 deaths
All-American college men's basketball players
American Basketball League (1961–62) players
American men's basketball players
Basketball players from Mississippi
Centers (basketball)
Chicago Packers expansion draft picks
Chicago Packers players
Cincinnati Royals draft picks
Cincinnati Royals players
Cleveland Pipers players
Detroit Pistons players
Indiana Hoosiers men's basketball players
People from Attala County, Mississippi
St. Louis Hawks players